Mount Christchurch is a mountain,  high, standing  southwest of Cape Lyttelton on the south side of Shackleton Inlet. It was discovered by the British National Antarctic Expedition, 1901–04, and named for the city of Christchurch, New Zealand, which generously supported the expedition.

References 

Mountains of the Ross Dependency
Shackleton Coast